Southern Qiang is a Sino-Tibetan language of the Qiangic branch spoken by approximately 81,300 people along the Minjiang river in Sichuan Province, China.

Southern Qiang dialects preserve archaic pronoun flexions, while they have disappeared in Northern Qiang. Unlike its close relative Northern Qiang, Southern Qiang is a tonal language.

Southern Qiang dialects
Southern Qiang is spoken in Li County (in Taoping , etc.), Wenchuan County (in Longxi , Luobozhai 萝卜寨, Miansi 绵虒, etc.), and parts of Mao County. It consists of seven dialects: Dajishan, Taoping, Longxi, Mianchi, Heihu, Sanlong, and Jiaochang, which are greatly divergent and are not mutually intelligible.

Names seen in the older literature for Southern Qiang dialects include Lofuchai (Lophuchai, Lopu Chai), Wagsod (Wa-gsod, Waszu), and Outside/Outer Mantse (Man-tzŭ). The Southern Qiang dialect of Puxi Township has been documented in detail by Huang (2007).

Liu (1998) adds Sānlóng and Jiàocháng (較場) as Southern subdialects.

Sims (2016) characterizes Southern Qiang as the perfective agreement suffixes innovation group. Individual dialects are highlighted in italics.

Southern Qiang
'inward' *ji innovation subgroup
North Wenchuan: Longxi 龙溪乡
South Wenchuan: Miansi 绵虒镇
'downward' *ɚ innovation subgroup
Western Lixian: Puxi 蒲溪乡, Xuecheng 薛城镇, Muka 木卡乡, Jiuzi 九子村
Eastern Lixian: Taoping 桃坪乡, Tonghua 通化乡

Phonology
The consonants of Southern Qiang are presented in the table below:

  are heard as velar  before front vowels.
  is also heard as a bilabial .

The vowels of Southern Qiang are presented in the table below:

Southern Qiang has six tones as represented below:

Status
As with many of the Qiangic languages, Southern Qiang is becoming increasingly threatened. Because the education system largely uses Standard Chinese as a medium of instruction for the Qiang people, and as a result of the universal access to schooling and television, most Qiang children are fluent or even monolingual in Chinese while an increasing percentage cannot speak Qiang.

See also
 Qiang people
 Qiangic languages

References

Bibliography

 
 
 

Qiangic languages
Tonal languages
Qiang people
Endangered Sino-Tibetan languages